Sultan Sir Omar Ali Saifuddien Sa'adul Khairi Waddien (23 September 1914 – 7 September 1986) was the 28th Sultan of Brunei, reigning from 4 June 1950 until his abdication from the throne on 5 October 1967.

He was also Brunei's first Minister of Defence after the country's independence. He was known as "The Architect of Modern Brunei", "The Royal Poet", and "The Father of Independence". During his reign, 3 chief ministers were appointed according to the Constitution. They were Ibrahim Mohammed Jaafar, Marsal Maun, and Yura Halim.

Early life and education
Pengiran Muda Omar Ali Saifuddien was born at Istana Kota, Kampong Sultan Lama, Brunei Town on 23 September 1914. He was the second son of Muhammad Jamalul Alam II and Raja Isteri Fatimah. Omar Ali Saifuddien, under the behest of his British mentor and father-figure Sir Roland Evelyn Turnbull, studied at the Malay College Kuala Kangsar (MCKK) in Perak, British Malaya from 1932 to 1936. As a result, he was the first of the Brunei sultans to receive formal education in a foreign institution.

After completing education in Malaya, he returned to Brunei in 1936 to work in the Forestry Department, as a Cadet Officer. In 1937, he was transferred to the Judiciary Department, also became an administrative officer in 1938. During the Japanese occupation of Brunei from 1941 until 1945, Omar Ali Saifuddien worked under State Secretary Ibrahim Mohammad Jahfar. After the Second World War, in 1947, he was subsequently appointed a member of Brunei State Council and chairman of the Syariah Court. He had the title Pengiran Bendahara Seri Maharaja Permaisuara conferred on him by his brother, Ahmad Tajuddin on 15 July 1947.

Reign (1950-1967)

Upon the sudden death of his brother in Singapore, who left no male heirs, on 4 June 1950, he was proclaimed the next Sultan on 6 June 1950. Omar Ali Saifuddien was crowned as the Sultan Dan Yang Di-Pertuan in the Old Lapau on 31 May 1951. In conjunction of the coronation, he was conferred with the Honorary Companion of the Most Distinguished Order of Saint Michael and Saint George (CMG) by Queen Elizabeth II. In September 1951, upon becoming Sultan, he performed his first pilgrimage to Mecca. He also attended the Coronation of Queen Elizabeth II at Westminster Abbey, London on 2 June 1953. On 9 June 1953, he was conferred with the Knight Commander of the Most Distinguished Order of Saint Michael and Saint George (KCMG) by Queen Elizabeth II.

Constitution of Brunei 

In 1952 the Sultan worked for the implementation of the constitution as the foundation of governance and the achievement of independence from the United Kingdom.

In July 1953, Sultan Omar Ali Saifuddien III formed a seven-member committee named Tujuh Serangkai to find out the citizens’ views regarding a written constitution for Brunei. In May 1954, a meeting attended by the Sultan, the Resident and the High Commissioner was held to discuss the findings of the committee. In March 1959 the Sultan led a delegation to London to discuss the proposed constitution. The British delegation was led by Alan Lennox-Boyd, 1st Viscount Boyd of Merton who was the Secretary of State for the Colonies. The British Government later accepted the draft constitution.

On 29 September 1959, the Constitution Agreement was signed in Brunei Town. The agreement was signed by Sultan Omar Ali Saifuddien III and Sir Robert Scott, the Commissioner-General for Southeast Asia. Some of the points of the constitution were:
 The Sultan was made the Supreme Head of State.
 Brunei was responsible for its internal administration.
 The British Government was now responsible for foreign and defence affairs only.
 The post of Resident was abolished and replaced by a British High Commissioner.
Five councils were also set up:
 The Executive Council
 The Legislative Council of Brunei
 The Privy Council
 The Council Of Succession
 The State Religious Council

National Development Plans

First National Development Plan
The First National Development plan was introduced in 1953. A total sum of B$100 million was approved by the Brunei State Council for the plan. E.R. Bevington from the Colonial Office in Fiji. A $14 million Gas Plant was built under the plan. In 1954, survey and exploration work were undertaken by the Brunei Shell Petroleum (BSP) on both offshore and onshore fields. By 1956, production reached 114,700 bpd. He had launched the first delivery of 10-inch oil pipeline from the seabed off the coast of the Seria oil field on 28 October 1964.

Developments on education were also made. In 1952, a written policy on education was made. By 1958, expenditure on education totaled at $4 million. Communications were also improved with new roads built and reconstruction works at Berakas Airport being completed at 1954.

Second National Development Plan
The Second National Development Plan was launched in 1962. A major oil and gas field was discovered in 1963, with this discovery, Liquefied Natural Gas (LNG) became important. Developments in the oil and gas sector has continued actively and oil production has steadily increased since then. The plan also saw an increase of production of meat and eggs. The fishing industry increased its output by 25% throughout the course of the plan. A deepwater Muara Port was also constructed under the plan. Power requirements were met and studies were made to provide electricity to rural areas. Efforts were made to eradicate malaria, with the help of the World Health Organization, under the plan. Efforts were successful, bringing the down the cases of malaria from 300 cases in 1953 to only 66 cases in 1959. The death rate was also brought down from 20 per thousand in 1947 to 11.3 per thousand in 1953. This has been attributed to public sanitation and improvement of drainage and the provision of piped pure water to the population.

State Election 1962 

Brunei's first state election was held on 30 and 31 August 1962. This was to elect members to sit in the Brunei Legislative Council. These elected members would then be involved in discussions of governmental policies. However, beside this, the Sultan still held the absolute power and authority in the government.

Among the political parties which contested in the election were Brunei People's Party (PRB), Barisan Nasional Organisation (BNO), and Brunei United Party (BUP). The polling went on for two days on 30 and 31 August 1962. The Brunei People's Party won the election.

Brunei Revolt 

When Tunku Abdul Rahman, the prime minister of the Federation of Malaya announced his proposal for a merger of Singapore, North Borneo, Sarawak, and Brunei, Omar Ali Saifuddien saw this as an opportunity for Brunei to achieve independence from British influence. He sent a congratulatory telegraph to Tunku Abdul Rahman, showing his support for the merger. For him, Brunei as a small country, still needed a protection of a larger country; the only way to achieve this was by merging with Malaysia and the rest of the states. This view was also shared by Lee Kuan Yew, the then-prime minister of Singapore.

The PRB, including its leader, A.M. Azahari was against the merger. According to them, if Brunei was to join the Federation, Brunei would not have achieve full independence. Instead, it was only transfer of power from Britain to Malaya. This was called as neo-colonisation. On 8 December 1962, the PRB led a rebellion against the government. With British military aid deployed from Singapore, the rebellion was later crushed and PRB were defeated.

North Borneo Federation 

After the rebellion, the discussion of joining the proposed North Borneo Federation continues. Omar Ali Saifuddien sent a delegation to attend meetings of the Malaysian Solidarity Consolidation Committee (MSCC). The views of the people were sought by the committee, which was chaired by Marsal Maun, Chief Minister of Brunei at that time.

In 1963, a meeting was held to discuss the prospect of Brunei joining Malaysia. They failed to reach an agreement on the issues of Brunei's oil revenue and federal rights to taxation. Even the initial date for the federation (which was 31 August 1963) was postponed to 16 September, no agreement was reached between the two sides.

Religious Affairs and Education 
Upon his ascension to the throne, Omar Ali Saiffudien also became the head of the Islamic religion in the country. One important contribution of the Sultan was to regularise Islamic administration in Brunei. In 1948, a religious council, comprising the Mohammedan Religious Advisers was formed. Due to the Sultan's initiative, the council met for the first time on 31 January 1948. He himself was appointed chairman of this council. After examining several laws on Islamic affairs in the Malay Peninsula, the board made new proposals regarding the religious administration in Brunei.

According to his speech during the Opening Ceremony of the Shariah Council,

He was also responsible for the formation of the Department of Religious Affairs on 1 July 1954. The department was responsible for all the important decisions made on Islam in Brunei. All aspects of Islamic activities such as community life, laws, education, missionary activities and social administration were supervised by these two religious bodies.

Notable visits by foreign leaders during reign
 On 21 October 1952, Brunei was visited by Princess Marina, the Duchess of Kent.
 On 25 September 1958, the Sultan received the visit of Syed Putra of Perlis, Hisamuddin of Selangor; Abu Bakar of Pahang and Sir Anthony Abell Governor of Sarawak, who attended the Berkhatan (circumcision) ceremony of the Sultan's sons, Prince Hassanal Bolkiah and Prince Mohamed Bolkiah.
 On 6 July 1959, the Sultan received the visit of Abdul Rahman of Negeri Sembilan, the first Yang Di Pertuan Agong of the Federation of Malaya and, Tunku Kurshiah, the first Raja Permaisuri Agong of Malaya.
 On 1 March 1965, Prince Philip, the Duke of Edinburgh visited Brunei.

Abdication

Announcement 

After ruling for 17 years, on 4 October 1967, Sultan Omar Ali Saifuddien willingly abdicated in favour of his eldest son, Crown Prince Hassanal Bolkiah. At the time of the announcement, the Crown Prince was in England, training as a cadet at the Royal Military Academy, Sandhurst. The Prince returned immediately to Brunei.

Coronation of Hassanal Bolkiah 
After his abdication, his eldest son, Crown Prince Hassanal Bolkiah ascended the throne to become the 29th Sultan of Brunei on 4 October 1967. It was then he was referred to as Seri Begawan Sultan (Retired Sultan).

The coronation ceremony began with the flying of the yellow flag at Bukit Panggal and the red flag at Bukit Sungai Kebun in February 1968. The announcement was also made throughout the country by Radio Brunei. The new Sultan rode to his coronation at the Lapau Building on 1 August 1968, on a royal carriage drawn by fifty specially selected soldiers of the Royal Brunei Malay Regiment.

Omar Ali Saifuddien placed the crown on the head of his son, and handed him the Keris si-Naga, symbol of supreme royal power in Brunei. Following this he removed his ceremonial sabre, swearing loyalty to his son as head of state and religion. Like his father before him, the new Sultan took vows to maintain peace and prosperity of the nation. He also promised to improve the standard of living of his subjects through various development projects and the protect and uphold Islam and Brunei's customs and traditions. After the crowning ceremony, the new Sultan proceeded in procession through the capital, passing lines of school children cheering Daulat Tuanku (Long live my King).

Among the foreign dignitaries who attended the ceremony were, the prime minister of Singapore, Lee Kuan Yew, the Malaysian prime minister, Tunku Abdul Rahman, and the British High Commissioner to Brunei, A.R. Adair, who represented Queen Elizabeth II.

Later life

After his abdication from the throne at the age of 53, he took the title of Paduka Seri Begawan Sultan (referred to the former sultan after the abdication), a title he held until his death in 1986. He was conferred with the Honorary Grand Commander of the Victorian Order (GCVO) by Her Majesty Queen Elizabeth II during her visit to Brunei on 29 February 1972.
 He witnessed the signing of the amendment and revision of the 1959 Agreement at the Lapau, Bandar Seri Begawan on 23 November 1971.
 He accompanied his son, Hassanal Bolkiah to London to initial the Treaty of Friendship and Cooperation on 29 September 1978.
 He attended the signing of the Treaty of Friendship and Cooperation to assume full responsibility towards the independence and sovereignty of Brunei Darussalam, and responsibility for foreign affairs and defence from the United Kingdom. He became one of the signatories of the treaty which was held at the Lapau, Bandar Seri Begawan on 7 January 1979.
He also attended the opening ceremony of Brunei's own national stadium, which named as Hassanal Bolkiah National Stadium at Berakas on 23 September 1983. It was one of the most modern stadiums in Southeast Asia during that time.

Independence of Brunei 

— Excerpt from the Declaration of Independence of Brunei

At the stroke of midnight on 31 December 1983 in a public event held at the Haji Sir Muda Omar Ali Saifuddien Park, Sultan Hassanal Bolkiah officially proclaimed that Brunei Darussalam had achieved its independence and sovereignty after 97 years of British protection. Soon after the reading of the declation, Omar Ali Saifuddien was honoured by the Sultan to lead the masses of people chanting Allahu Akbar (God is Great) three times. This was followed by the singing of the national anthem, a 21-gun salute by the Royal Brunei Land Forces and a prayer was read by the State Mufti to give God's blessings to the newly independent nation.

Post-Independence 
Although he had abdicated 17 years ago and Brunei had achieved its independence, he continued to play an important role after his appointed by the Sultan as Minister of Defence in Brunei's first cabinet ministers and consequently conferred the rank of Field Marshal in the Royal Brunei Armed Forces.

He also welcomed the arrival of Yasser Arafat, the Chairman of Palestine Liberation Organisation (PLO) on his official visit to Brunei on 26 July 1984.

Death 
Omar Ali Saifuddien died on 7 September 1986 at the age of 71. It was reported that he has been sick for weeks prior to his death. He was granted a state funeral the following day, which Radio Television Brunei covered, proceeded by a lying in state at the Istana Nurul Iman.

Several foreign leaders had given their quotes about Omar Ali Saifuddien,

A Surah Yassin book was published with the consent of Hassanal Bolkiah, to mark the 40th day of the passing away of his late father.

Churchill Memorial Building
He was a keen admirer of the wartime British Prime Minister, Sir Winston Churchill. In 1971, his admiration became clear when he opened the world's only museum solely dedicated to Winston Churchill and it was named the Churchill Memorial Building, Bandar Seri Begawan which costed an estimated $5 million. Since its opening, it had been a notable tourist attraction in Brunei and also became well known throughout Southeast Asia. In 1992, in conjunction with Silver Jubilee of His Majesty's Ascension to the Throne celebrations, the memorial had become the Royal Brunei Regalia Building. Also in 2017, the building was renamed to Royal Regalia Museum in conjunction with the Golden Jubilee.

Personal life

Family

His first wife was Dayang Siti Amin binti Pehin Orang Kaya Pekerma Setia Laila Diraja Awang Haji Hashim, but the couple had no children and later divorced in 1944. On 6 September 1941, he married his cousin as his second wife, Pengiran Anak Damit binti Pengiran Bendahara Seri Maharaja Permaisuara Pengiran Anak Abdul Rahman. She was the great-granddaughter of Hashim Jalilul Alam Aqamaddin. She bore him 10 children:

Sultan Hassanal Bolkiah (born 1946)
 Prince Mohamed Bolkiah (born 1947)
 Prince Sufri Bolkiah (born 1951)
 Prince Jefri Bolkiah (born 1954)
 Princess Masna Bolkiah (born 1948)
 Princess Nor'ain Bolkiah (born 1950)
 Princess Amal Umi Kalthum Al-Islam Bolkiah (born 1956)
 Princess Amal Rakiah Bolkiah (born 1957)
 Princess Amal Nasibah Bolkiah (born 1960)
 Princess Amal Jefriah Bolkiah (born 1963)

On 13 September 1979, his wife, Paduka Suri Seri Begawan Raja Isteri Pengiran Anak Damit died. After that, for the last time, he married Pengiran Bini Pengiran Anak Hajah Salhah binti Pengiran Bendahara Seri Maharaja Permaisuara Pengiran Anak Abdul Rahman, who was also his sister-in-law.

Personal interests 
He had an interest in writing poems. Apart from that, he was also known for designing the national medals. He also made a design of flowers on his clothes, the "Tenunan Brunei" which he wore on several occasions. Also, he was interested in self-defence martial arts such as silat and kuntau.

Legacy

Namesakes 
 The capital, Brunei Town, was renamed Bandar Seri Begawan in his honor, on 5 October 1970, by his eldest son, Hassanal Bolkiah. "Begawan" was Omar Ali Saifuddien's title after he abdicated.
 Omar Ali Saifuddin Mosque was named after the sultan, completed in 1958.
 Taman Haji Sir Muda Omar Ali Saifuddien at the capital.
 Sultan Omar Ali Saifuddien College.
 The Seri Begawan Religious Teaching University.
 The Sultan Omar Ali Saifuddien Institute of Islamic studies of Universiti Brunei Darussalam.
 The Paduka Seri Begawan Sultan Science College.
 The Paduka Seri Begawan Sultan Omar Ali Saifuddien Mosque in Kampong Katimahar.
 The longest bridge in Southeast Asia, the Temburong Bridge, 30-kilometre (19-mile) long which connects Brunei-Muara District with Temburong District was named Sultan Haji Omar Ali Saifuddien Bridge in recognition to his role as the Architect of Modern Brunei on 14 July 2020.

Appearance in currency 

 His portrait is depicted on the obverse of the 1967 issue of coins. The reverse of these coins, and all subsequent series, was designed by Christopher Ironside OBE. The coins issued were 1, 5, 10, 20, and 50 cent.
 His portrait appears on all the first issue notes (dated 1967) in denominations of 1, 5, 10, 50 and 100 ringgit/dollar.
 His portrait is also depicted on Brunei's current issue 500 ringgit/dollar notes dated 2006 and 2013.
 An image of him crowning his son as his successor appears on the reverse of the commemorative 25 ringgit/dollar note dated 1992.

Bibliography

Honours 
  :
 Honorary Companion of the Order of St Michael and St George (CMG) (1 May 1951)
 Honorary Knight Commander of the Order of St Michael and St George (KCMG) – Sir (9 June 1953)
 Honorary Knight Grand Cross of the Royal Victorian Order (GCVO) – Sir 
 : 
 Honorary Recipient of the Order of the Crown of the Realm (DMN) (25 April 1958)
:
  First Class of the Royal Family Order of Johor (DK I) (11 February 1960)
:
  First Class of the Royal Family Order of Selangor (DK I) (1961)

References

Further reading 
 
 
Naimah S. Talib. 2020. "Refashioning the monarchy in Brunei: Sultan Omar Ali and the quest for royal absolutism." in  Monarchies and decolonisation in Asia. Manchester University Press

1914 births
1986 deaths
Monarchs who abdicated
20th-century Sultans of Brunei

Honorary Companions of the Order of St Michael and St George
Honorary Knights Commander of the Order of St Michael and St George
Honorary Knights Grand Cross of the Royal Victorian Order
First Classes of Royal Family Order of Selangor
First Classes of the Royal Family Order of Johor